= List of executive orders by Elpidio Quirino =

Listed below are executive orders signed by Philippine President Elpidio Quirino.

== 1948 ==
No.	Title	Date signed
128	Organizing the barrio of Linugos and certain other barrios of the municipality of Gingoog, province of Oriental Misamis, into an independent municipality under the name of Linugos with the seat of government at the barrio of Linugos	April 21, 1948
129	Organizing the barrios of Medina and Portulin of the municipality of Talisayan, province of Oriental Misamis, into an independent municipality under the name of Medina	April 21, 1948
130	Organizing the Turtle Islands in the Sulu Archipelago as a municipal district	April 21, 1948
131	Organizing the sitio of Bayong of the barrio of Lungsudaan, municipality of Sierra-Bullones, province of Bohol, into an independent barrio under the name of Bayong	April 21, 1948
132	Amending Section 1, Rule IV, of the Civil Service Rules, regarding rating of examination papers	April 21, 1948
133	Declaring the Buendia and South Avenues as national roads	April 21, 1948
134	Transferring the seat of government of the municipality of Barcelona, province of Sorsogon, from its present location to the sitio of Mapapac, barrio of Paghaluban	April 22, 1948
135	Regulating the establishment, maintenance and operation of frontons and basque pelota games (jai alai)	May 4, 1948
136	Organizing certain barrios and sitios of the municipality of Gamu, province of Isabela, into an independent municipality under the name of Roxas	May 5, 1948
137	Amending Executive Order No. 12, dated August 19, 1946, entitled "Reorganizing the Quezon Memorial Committee, created under Executive Order Number Seventy-Nine, dated 17 December 1945"	May 7, 1948
138	Abolishing the municipal districts of San Miguel and Libas in the province of Surigao and annexing the territories thereof to the municipality of Tago, same province	May 12, 1948
139	Organizing the municipal district of Aurora in the province of Isabela into a regular municipality under the same name	May 12, 1948
140	Organizing certain barrios of the municipality of Lemery, province of Batangas, into an independent municipality under the name of Pansipit	May 12, 1948
141	Organizing certain barrios of the municipality of Escalante, province of Negros Occidental, into an independent municipality under the name of Toboso	May 19, 1948
142	Amending Executive Order No. 91 dated February 5, 1946, entitled "Fixing new ceiling prices of all commodities and for other purposes"	May 28, 1948
143	Increasing to fifty per centum of the actual production of logs, flitches and sawn lumber, the quantity that may be exported by producers thereof	June 5, 1948
144	Authorizing the Board of Directors of the Philippine Charity Sweepstakes Office to order the printing of sweepstakes tickets in a private printing establishment of good standing	June 14, 1948
145	Authorizing the collection of voluntary contributions of five, ten, and twenty centavos from pupils and students enrolled in public and private elementary, secondary, and collegiate schools, respectively, with which to finance the repair or reconstruction of the house occupied by Dr. Jose Rizal in Calamba, Laguna, and of Dapitan Park in Zamboanga	June 19, 1948
146	Suspending the collection of irrigation charges in excess of six pesos per hectare for a period of one year	June 22, 1948
147	Extending the periods provided for in Sections 2, 4 and 5 of Republic Act No. 199, entitled "An Act to provide for the retirement of treasury certificates of pre-war series and for other purposes	June 29, 1948
148	Suspending the provisions of Executive Order No. 140, dated May 12, 1948, organizing certain barrios of the municipality of Lemery, province of Batangas, into an independent municipality under the name of Pansipit	July 2, 1948
149	Amending Paragraph 3(b) of Executive Order No. 95, dated October 13, 1947	July 7, 1948
150	Creating the Social Security Study Commission	July 7, 1948
151	Organizing the municipal districts of Samal, Lupon and Kapalong, province of Davao, into regular municipalities, under the same names	July 8, 1948
152	Organizing the municipal districts of Momungan, Pantar and Balut, all of the province of Lanao, into an independent municipality	July 8, 1948
153	Prescribing the procedure for the reception of foreign public vessels	July 9, 1948
154	Extending the period for filing applications for educational benefits granted by Republic Act No. 65	July 9, 1948
155	Fixing Friday, October 1, 1948, as Census Day	July 9, 1948
156	Organizing into four regular municipalities the municipal districts of Compostela, Moncayo, Saug, Camansa, Surup, Sigaboy, Batulaki and Caburan, all of the province of Davao	July 9, 1948
157	Defining the boundary limits of the province of Nueva Vizcaya	July 10, 1948
158	Creating a Labor-Management Advisory Board	July 28, 1948
159	Organizing certain barrios of the municipality of Pandan, province of Catanduanes, into an independent municipality under the name of Caramoran	August 7, 1948
160	Transferring the powers, duties and functions of the Inter-Departmental Committee on Allocations to the Import Control Board and providing said board with an independent office force and the necessary appropriations to carry out its functions	August 7, 1948
161	Amending Executive Order No. 157, dated July 10, 1948	August 12, 1948
162	Organizing certain barrios of the municipality of Kawayan, province of Leyte, together with the barrio of Jamoraon of the municipality of Naval, same province, into an independent municipality under the name of Almeria, with the seat of government at the barrio of Almeria	August 12, 1948
163	Extending the period fixed in Administrative Order No. 54, dated May 7, 1948, within which the committee created to examine the actual conditions in the Surplus Property Commission shall submit its report and authorizing the chairman, members and such assistants thereof as the President may authorize, to receive per diems	August 12, 1948
164	Amending further Executive Order No. 79, dated December 17, 1945, entitled "Creating a Quezon Memorial Committee to take charge of the nation-wide campaign to raise funds for the erection of a national monument in honor of the late President Manuel L. Quezon"	August 12, 1948
165	Organizing certain barrios of the municipality of Balingasag, Oriental Misamis, into an independent municipality	August 18, 1948
166	Requiring the registration and deposit of Bank of the Philippine Islands circulating notes	August 20, 1948
167	Providing for the coordination of all national intelligence activities of the Government	August 24, 1948
168	Amending Sections 14 and 19 of Executive Order No. 135, dated May 4, 1948, entitled "Regulating the establishment, maintenance and operation of frontons and basque pelota games (jai alai)"	August 25, 1948
169	Creating an Opium Custodian Committee for the enforcement of Act No. 2381, as amended by Act No. 3006, otherwise known as the Opium Law	August 30, 1948
170	Authorizing the Philippine School of Commerce of the Bureau of Public Schools, Department of Education, to operate night classes; to employ instructors and administrative personnel thereof from teachers, officials and employees in and/or out of the Government service; to collect fees from the students enrolled therein for operating expenses, and for other purposes	August 31, 1948
171	Waiving the additional progressive taxes to be collected from and paid by, proprietors and operators of sugar mills for the 1947–1948 crop	September 13, 1948
172	Organizing certain sitios in the municipality of Calape, province of Bohol, into barrios	September 15, 1948
173	Changing the name of the municipality of New Leyte, province of Davao, to Saug	September 13, 1948
174	Transferring to the Philippine Constabulary the 8,000 officers and enlisted men of the Armed Forces of the Philippines, who were attached to the Constabulary on January 1, 1948	September 13, 1948
175	Declaring sunken, beached and damaged vessels and other craft, including cargo, lying in Philippine waters as a result of the last war and not yet removed by their former owners as abandoned in favor of the Government; authorizing the Secretary of Commerce and Industry to enter into contract with private entities to clear Philippine waters of such sunken, beached or damaged vessels and other craft, and for the disposal thereof and their cargo or scrap metal salvaged	September 16, 1948
176	Amending Executive Order No. 158, dated July 28, 1948, entitled "Creating a Labor-Management Advisory Board"	September 29, 1948
177	Extending further the periods provided for in Sections 2, 4 and 5 of Republic Act No. 199 entitled "An Act to provide for the retirement of treasury certificates of pre-war series, and for other purposes"	September 29, 1948
178	Creating a commission to study the problems of the rice industry and the recurrent rice shortage and make recommendations on a consolidated solution to the rice problem	October 1, 1948
179	Further extending the period fixed in Administrative Order No. 54, dated May 7, 1948, as extended by Executive Order No. 163, dated August 12, 1948, within which the committee created to examine the actual conditions in the Surplus Property Commission shall submit its report and recommendations	October 2, 1948
180	Establishing the classification of roads	October 2, 1948
181	Organizing a portion of the municipality of Mansalay, province of Mindoro, into an independent municipality under the name of Roxas	October 15, 1948
182	Regulations governing the temporary appointment of reserve officers of the Armed Forces of the Philippines in grades lower than their permanent reserve grades	November 19, 1948
183	Authorizing municipal governments to increase salaries of municipal policemen	November 9, 1948
184	Declaring a rice emergency, providing for Government control of the purchase or acquisition of rice or palay at a fixed price; creating a Rice Emergency Board to advise the President in meeting the emergency, and fixing the duties thereof	November 19, 1948
185	Organizing certain barrios of the municipality of Cauayan, Negros Occidental, into an independent municipality under the name of Sipalay	November 20, 1948
186	Organizing certain barrios of the municipality of Cauayan, Negros Occidental, into an independent municipality under the name of Asia	November 20, 1948
187	Fixing the amount and promulgating the regulations to govern the granting of per diems and traveling expenses allowed to Government officials and employees used for census taking under Section 35 of Republic Act No. 36	November 22, 1948
188	Extending the period provided in Section 3 of Republic Act No. 211 entitled "An Act authorizing the retirement and redemption of the circulating notes lawfully issued by the Philippine National Bank and the registration and deposit of such notes illegally issued, appropriating funds therefor"	December 6, 1948
189	Allowing the free importation of medical articles or supplies intended for research, clinical investigation or experimental purposes in connection with the treatment of human diseases when imported by, or for the account or benefit of, the Government or any of its branches, agencies or instrumentalities	December 15, 1948
190	Extending up to December 31, 1949, the period fixed in Executive Order No. 145, dated June 19, 1948, for the collection of funds with which to finance the repair or reconstruction of the house occupied by Dr. Jose Rizal in Calamba, Laguna, and of Dapitan Park in Zamboanga	December 16, 1948
191	Extending the provisions of Executive Order No. 62, dated June 21, 1947, entitled "Regulating rentals for houses and lots for residential buildings," until December 31, 1949	December 23, 1948
192	On the control of exports from the Philippines	December 24, 1948
193	Prescribing rules and regulations to carry into effect the control and regulation of imports of non-essential and luxury articles into the Philippines as provided for in Republic Act No. 330	December 28, 1948
194	Authorizing the Director of Forestry to issue to tobacco growers gratuitous license to cut forest products exclusively for the construction or repair of tobacco warehouses and curing sheds for two years	December 29, 1948
195	Segregating the municipal districts of Lebak and Salaman from the municipalities of Kiamba and Dinang, province of Cotabato, as organized under Executive Order No. 82 of August 18, 1947, and organizing them into an independent municipality under the name of Lebak with the seat of government at the sitio of Kalamansig	December 31, 1948

== 1949 ==
No.	Title	Date signed
196	Authorizing zone commanders of the Philippine Constabulary to appoint special courts-martial within their respective jurisdictions	January 4, 1949
197	Organizing Colabao and Carawisan Second, both of the municipality of San Remigio, province of Antique, into independent barrios under the same names	January 4, 1949
198	Organizing the sitios of Tinubdan and Malingin of the barrio of Bagay, and Lanao of the barrio of Pajo, in the municipality of Daanbantayan, province of Cebu, into independent barrios under the same names	January 4, 1949
199	Organizing certain portion of the municipality of Cabagan, province of Isabela, into an independent municipality under the name of Santo Tomas	January 5, 1949
200	Amending Executive Order No. 143, dated June 5, 1948, so as to extend the time within which logs, flitches and sawn lumber may be exported by the actual producers thereof	January 14, 1949
201	Amending Executive Order No. 107, dated December 3, 1947, entitled "Prohibiting the execution of Government contracts wherein the Government is required to make advance payment for services not yet rendered and/or supplies and materials not yet delivered"	January 14, 1949
202	Extending further the period provided in Section 3 of Republic Act No. 211 entitled "An Act authorizing the retirement and redemption of the circulating notes lawfully issued by the Philippine National Bank and the registration and deposit of such notes illegally issued, appropriating funds therefor"	February 4, 1949
203	Organizing certain barrios and sitios of the municipality of Initao, province of Misamis Oriental, into an independent municipality under the name of Manticao	February 7, 1949
204	Organizing certain barrios and sitios of the municipalities of Clarin, Inabanga and Balilihan, province of Bohol, into an independent municipality under the name of Borja	February 9, 1949
205	Organizing certain barrios and sitios of the municipality of Caramoan, province of Camarines Sur, into an independent municipality under the name of Anderson, with the seat of government at the barrio of San Miguel	March 4, 1949
206	Amending Section 4 of Executive Order No. 193, dated December 28, 1948, entitled "Prescribing rules and regulations to carry into effect the control and regulation of imports of non-essential and luxury articles into the Philippines as provided for in Republic Act No. 330"	March 16, 1949
207	Fixing office hours during the hot session	March 19, 1949
208	Organizing a certain portion of the municipality of Tubod, province of Lanao, into an independent municipality under the name of Lala, with the seat of government at the barrio of Lala	March 22, 1949
209	Amending Executive Order No. 193, dated December 28, 1948	March 30, 1949
210	Organizing a certain portion of the municipality of Mamburao, province of Mindoro, into an independent municipality under the name of Santa Cruz	April 1, 1949
211	Extending the period provided in Section 3 of Republic Act No. 211 entitled "An Act authorizing the retirement and redemption of the circulating notes lawfully issued by the Philippine National Bank and the registration and deposit of such notes illegally issued, appropriating funds therefor"	April 7, 1949
212	Lifting the suspension the provisions of Executive Order No. 140, dated May 12, 1948, organizing certain barrios of the municipality of Lemery, province of Batangas, into an independent municipality and authorizing the immediate organization thereof under the name of Agoncillo	April 7, 1949
213	Amending further Executive Order No. 79, dated December 17, 1945, entitled "Creating a Quezon Memorial Committee to take charge of the nation-wide campaign to raise funds for the erection of a national monument in honor of the late President Manuel L. Quezon"	April 20, 1949
214	Organizing the municipal district of Santol, province of La Union, into regular municipality	April 30, 1949
215	Repealing Executive Order No. 61, dated June 20, 1947, so as to restore the membership of the Surplus Property Commission as provided in Executive Order No. 27, dated November 18, 1946	May 19, 1949
216	Amending Executive Order No. 82, dated August 18, 1947, by restoring to the municipality of Dulawan the barrios or sitios of Barurao and Lambayong which were annexed to the new municipality of Buluan under said Executive Order	May 28, 1949
217	Transferring the seat of government of the sub-province of Ifugao, Mountain Province	May 28, 1949
218	Changing the name of the municipality of Andreson, province of Camarines Sur, to Garchitorena	May 28, 1949
219	Defining the boundary line between the municipalities of Parang and Nuling, province of Cotabato	May 28, 1949
220	Amending Item 41, Section 1, of Executive Order No. 192, dated December 24, 1948, entitled "On the control of exports from the Philippines"	June 4, 1949
221	Lifting the ban on the exportation of lumber, and timber under certain conditions	June 7, 1949
222	Organizing a portion of the municipality of Tubod, province of Lanao, into a municipality under the name of Baroy, and annexing to these municipalities certain portions of the municipality of Kolambugan	June 10, 1949
223	Authorizing the allotment of vacant agricultural lands of the public domain to all interested citizens desiring to cultivate them and granting such citizens the option to acquire the same by homestead of purchase, to accelerate the production of foodstuffs and other prime commodities	June 14, 1949
224	Annexing a certain portion of the territory of the municipal district of Claveria, Misamis Oriental, to the municipalities of Linugos, Gingoog, Medina and Talisayan, same province	June 15, 1949
225	Appropriating funds for the operation of the Government of the Republic of the Philippines during the period from July 1, 1949, to June 30, 1950, and for other purposes	June 15, 1949
226	Appropriating the sum of ₱6,000,000 to defray the expenses, in connection with, and incidental to, the holding of the national elections to be held on the second Tuesday of November, 1949	June 15, 1949
227	Amending Executive Order No. 82, dated August 18, 1947, by organizing into a municipality under the name of Tumbao the former municipal districts of Tumbao and Gambar, which were annexed by said Executive Order to the municipalities of Cotabato and Midsayap	June 16, 1949
228	Organizing certain barrios of the municipality of Manjuyod, Negros Oriental, into an independent municipality under the name of Payabon	June 17, 1949
229	Organizing certain portions of the municipalities of Balilihan, Antequera and Tubigon, all of the province of Bohol, into an independent municipality under the name of San Jacinto	June 17, 1949
230	Organizing certain barrios of the municipal district of Pantao-Ragat, province of Lanao, into an independent municipal district under the name of Matungao	June 20, 1949
231	Amending Executive Order No. 193, dated December 28, 1948, and No. 209, dated March 30, 1949	June 28, 1949
232	Converting into municipalities the municipal districts of Aborlan and Brooke's Point, both of the province of Palawan	June 28, 1949
233	Amending further the First Paragraph of Executive Order No. 79, dated December 17, 1945, entitled "Creating a Quezon Memorial Committee to take charge of the nation-wide campaign to raise funds for the erection of a national monument in honor of the late President Manuel L. Quezon"	June 30, 1949
234	Organizing certain barrios of the municipality of Balingasag, province of Misamis Oriental, into an independent municipality	July 1, 1949
235	Providing for the coordination of all national intelligence activities of the Government	July 10, 1949
236	Organizing the municipalities of Digos, Padada, and Panabo, in the province of Davao	July 1, 1949
237	Organizing the municipal district of Kapatagan, province of Lanao, into a regular municipality	July 5, 1949
238	Re-establishing the former municipality of Las Navas, in the province of Samar	July 8, 1949
239	Appropriating additional funds for the operation of the Government of the Republic of the Philippines during the period from July 1, 1949, to June 30, 1950, and for other purposes	July 8, 1949
240	Continuing the appropriations authorized by the Congress for the operation and maintenance of certain existing activities or services of the Government of the Republic of the Philippines during the period from July 1, 1949, to June 30, 1950, and for other purposes	July 8, 1949
241	Amending Executive Order No. 169, dated August 30, 1948, entitled "Creating an Opium Custodian Committee for the enforcement of Act No. 2381, as amended by Act No. 3006, otherwise known as the Opium Law"	July 8, 1949
242	Prescribing rules and regulations for the appointment of reserve officers into the Regular Force, Armed Forces of the Philippines	July 9, 1949
243	Organizing certain barrios of the municipality of Pili, Camarines Sur, into an independent municipality under the name of Ocampo	July 15, 1949
244	Creating the municipalities of Mobo, Baleno, Cawayan, Mandaon, Balud and Uson, in the province of Masbate	July 18, 1949
245	Organizing a portion of the municipality of Pagadian, province of Zamboanga, into an independent municipality under the name of Labangan	July 20, 1949
246	Organizing certain portions of the municipalities of Baler and Infanta, Quezon province, into independent municipalities, under the names of Maria Aurora and General Nakar, respectively	July 21, 1949
247	Creating the municipality of Marabut, province of Samar	July 22, 1949
248	Creating the municipality of San Jose in the province of Samar	July 25, 1949
249	Organizing a certain portion of the municipality of Kabasalan, province of Zamboanga, into an independent municipality under the name of Ipil	July 26, 1949
250	Organizing into an independent municipality, under the name of Glan, the former municipal district bearing the same name, now a part of the municipality of Buayan, province of Cotabato	July 27, 1949
251	Organizing a certain portion of the municipality of Magarao, province of Camarines Sur, into an independent municipality, under the name of Bombon, with the seat of government at the barrio of Bombon	July 27, 1949
252	Extending the period for filing of the tax returns required by Section 4 of Commonwealth Act No. 567 and authorizing the Sugar Rehabilitation and Readjustment Commission to examine the duly certified balance sheets and operating statements of the sugar centrals affected and make appropriate recommendations thereon	August 1, 1949
253	Creating the municipalities of Anini-y and Libertad in the province of Antique	August 5, 1949
254	Organizing a portion of the municipality of Balasan, province of Iloilo, into an independent municipality under the name of Batad, with the seat of government at the barrio of Batad	August 5, 1949
255	Organizing the municipality of Giporlos out of a certain portion of the municipality of Balangiga, province of Samar	August 19, 1949
256	Amending further Executive Order No. 72, dated December 3, 1936, establishing a classification of ports	August 19, 1949
257	Abolishing the municipal district of Mandulog, province of Lanao	August 30, 1949
258	Creating the municipality of Sinacaban, in the province of Misamis Occidental	August 30, 1949
259	Creating a Fire Prevention Board	August 30, 1949
260	Amending Paragraph 29 of Executive Order No. 303, dated September 26, 1940, entitled "Promulgating rules and regulations governing the appointment and supervision of Government pensionados"	August 30, 1949
261	Waiving the additional progressive taxes to be collected from, and paid by, proprietors and operators of certain sugar mills for the 1948–1949 crop	August 31, 1949
262	Organizing the barrios and sitios on Daram and Parasan Islands, municipality of Zumarraga, province of Samar, into an independent municipality under the name of Daram	September 1, 1949
263	Prescribing the procedure for the review of court-martial cases wherein the accused are members of the Philippine Constabulary and the disposition of the records thereof	September 8, 1949
264	Further amending Section 5-A and 5-B of Chapter III of Executive Order No. 178, dated December 17, 1938, entitled "Prescribing the procedure including the modes of proof, in cases before courts martial, courts of inquiry, military commission and other military tribunals of the Army of the Philippines", as amended by Executive Order No. 47, dated June 6, 1945	September 8, 1949
265	Organizing certain barrios of the municipality of Mabini, province of Bohol, into an independent municipality under the name of Alicia	September 16, 1949
266	Organizing the barrio of Tunga, municipality of Barugo, province of Leyte, into an independent municipality under the name of Tunga	September 24, 1949
267	Converting the municipal district of Antatet, province of Isabela, into a regular municipality	September 28, 1949
268	Organizing a certain portion of the municipality of Angandanan, province of Isabela, into an independent municipality under the name of Alicia	September 28, 1949
269	Organizing a portion of the municipality of Jones, province of Isabela, into an independent municipality under the name of San Agustin	September 28, 1949
270	Organizing a portion of the municipality of Pagalungan, province of Cotabato, into an independent municipality under the name of Pikit	September 29, 1949
271	Creating certain portions of the municipalities of Biliran and Caibiran, province of Leyte, into an independent municipality under the name of Cabucgayan	September 29, 1949
272	Declaring the Puerto Princesa Airport Road Extension as national road	September 29, 1949
273	Amending further Executive Order No. 72, dated December 3, 1936, establishing a classification of ports	September 29, 1949
274	Waiving the additional progressive taxes to be collected from, and paid by, the proprietors and operators of the Pampanga Sugar Mills for the 1948–1949 crop	September 29, 1949
275	Abolishing the Surplus Property Commission and transferring its powers, functions and duties to the committee created under Administrative Order No. 90, dated May 19, 1949	September 30, 1949
276	Transferring the seat of government of the municipality of Camalaniugan, province of Cagayan, to the barrios of Bulala and Dugo, in the same municipality	October 5, 1949
277	Creating the municipality of Sante Fe out of a portion of the municipality of Palo, province of Leyte	October 10, 1949
278	Organizing a portion of the municipality of Burauen, province of Leyte, into an independent municipality, under the name of Julita	October 10, 1949
279	Organizing certain barrios of the municipality of Rosario, province of Batangas, into an independent municipality under the name of Padre Garcia	October 11, 1949
280	Returning to the jurisdiction of the Department of Agriculture and Natural Resources and the Bureau of Lands all public lands formerly covered by expired Japanese leases and applications of dummies of Japanese and other foreign nationals previously placed under the administration and control of the National Abaca and Other Fibers Corporation	October 12, 1949
281	Creating the municipality of Lapinig, Samar	October 13, 1949
282	Organizing certain barrios of the municipality of Pila, province of Laguna, into an independent municipality under the name of Victoria	October 14, 1949
283	Suspending the effectivity of Executive Order No. 280, dated October 12, 1949, until further orders	October 15, 1949
284	Organizing the municipality of Tabango out of certain portions of the municipalities of San Isidro and Leyte, province of Leyte	October 15, 1949
285	Creating a permanent committee to examine, count and destroy by burning Postal Savings Bank stamp cards received as deposits and damaged and unserviceable postage stamps	October 18, 1949
286	Creating a Fair Trade Board	October 18, 1949
287	Extending up to December 31, 1950, the period fixed in Executive Order No. 145, dated June 19, 1948, as amended by Executive Order No. 190, dated December 16, 1948, for the collection of funds with which to finance the repair or reconstruction of the house occupied by Dr. Jose Rizal in Calamba, Laguna, and of Dapitan Park in Zamboanga	October 21, 1949
288	Amending Executive Order No. 278 entitled "Organizing a portion of the municipality of Burauen, province of Leyte, into an independent municipality, under the name of Julita"	October 21, 1949
289	Organizing a portion of the municipality of Gonzaga, province of Cagayan, into an independent municipality under the name of Santa Ana	October 21, 1949
290	Restricting the carrying of firearms before, during and after the general elections on November 8, 1949	October 31, 1949
291	Transferring the seat of government of the municipality of Nueva Valencia, province of Iloilo, to the barrio of Igang, in the same municipality	November 1, 1949
292	Organizing a portion of the municipality of Liloan, province of Leyte, into an independent municipality under the name of San Francisco	November 1, 1949
293	Organizing a portion of the municipality of Cauayan, province of Isabela, into an independent municipality under the name of Cabatuan	November 5, 1949
294	Extending the period for the restricted carrying of firearms until December 31, 1949, inclusive	November 19, 1949
295	Revising the rules and regulations on the control of imports of non-essential and luxury articles into the Philippines as provided for in Republic Act No. 330	November 29, 1949
296	Extending indefinitely the period for the restricted carrying of firearms	December 17, 1949
297	Amending Executive Order No. 295, dated November 29, 1949	December 24, 1949

== 1950 ==
No.	Title	Date signed
298	Organizing certain barrios of the municipality of Pilar, province of Abra, into an independent municipality under the name of San Isidro	January 5, 1950
299	Providing instructions to be followed in the conduct of public affairs during the time that the President is outside the Philippines	January 6, 1950
300	Amending Executive Order No. 93 of the President of the Philippines, dated October 4, 1941, entitled "Abolishing the National Enterprises Control Board, creating the Government Enterprises Council, transferring the Metropolitan Transportation Service to the Manila Railroad Company, dissolving and merging certain corporations owned or controlled by the Government, and for other purposes"	January 6, 1950
301	Amending Executive Order No. 295, dated November 29, 1949	January 6, 1950
302	Amending Executive Order No. 297, dated December 24, 1949	February 14, 1950
303	Returning to the Armed Forces of the Philippines seven Philippine Constabulary battalions out of the eight thousand officers and enlisted men of the Armed Forces of the Philippines transferred to the Constabulary under Executive Order No. 174, dated September 13, 1948	February 17, 1950
304	Calling upon all inhabitants of the Philippines and mobilizing all Government agencies and instrumentalities for the intensification of the national food production campaign	February 17, 1950
305	Regulating the importation of wheat flour, authorizing the Philippine Relief and Trade Rehabilitation Administration (PRATRA) to effectuate control of its importation and distribution, and for other purposes	March 17, 1950
306	Amending Executive Order No. 297, dated December 24, 1949	March 18, 1950
307	Fixing office hours during the hot season	March 24, 1950
308	Reorganizing the Armed Forces of the Philippines	March 30, 1950
309	Making the Director of Public Works an ex officio member of the National Urban Planning Commission and amending Executive Order No. 98, dated March 11, 1946, accordingly	March 30, 1948
310	Finally requiring the registration and deposit of Bank of the Philippine Islands circulating notes	April 22, 1950
311	Abolishing the municipality of Lapinig in the province of Samar, and restoring the different barrios composing this municipality to the respective municipalities and the municipal district to which they belonged before becoming parts of Lapinig	April 30, 1950
312	Fixing the boundary line between the municipal districts of Sabilan and Tuba, Benguet, Mountain Province	May 1, 1950
313	Regulating the issuance of building permits to American nationals or associations for the erection of war memorials or monuments in the Philippines	May 1, 1950
314	Amending Section 16 of Executive Order No. 135, dated May 4, 1948, entitled "Regulating the establishment, maintenance and operation of frontons and basque pelota games (jai-alai)"	May 5, 1950
315	Amending Executive Order No. 259, dated August 30, 1949, creating a Fire Prevention Board	May 5, 1950
316	Further amending Executive Order No. 278, dated October 10, 1949, as amended by Executive Order No. 288, dated October 21, 1949, creating the municipality of Julita, province of Leyte	May 5, 1950
317	Declaring certain barrios, which were the subject matter of the former boundary dispute between the municipalities of Barugo and San Miguel, both of the province of Leyte, a part of the municipality of Barugo	May 22, 1950
318	Creating an Integrity Board to receive and pass upon all complaints against the conduct of any officer of the Government, or for graft, corruption, dereliction of duty or any other irregularity in office; to recommend to the President the course of action to be taken in each case and to investigate specific cases thereof	May 25, 1950
319	Creating the Department of Economic Coordination	May 25, 1950
320	Amending Executive Order No. 242, dated July 9, 1949 by removing the maximum age limits therein prescribed for appointment of reserve officers into the Regular Force, Armed Forces of the Philippines	May 27, 1950
321	Prescribing the Code of the National Flag and the National Anthem of the Republic of the Philippines	June 12, 1950
322	Organizing a portion of the municipality of Sagay, Oriental Misamis, into a regular municipality under the name of Guinsiliban	June 13, 1950
323	Transferring the seat of government of the municipality of Dinaig, province of Cotabato, to the sitio of Capiton	June 16, 1950
324	Organizing a certain portion of the municipality of Abuyog, province of Leyte, into a regular municipality under the name of MacArthur	June 17, 1950
325	Extending the term of the Code Commission	June 17, 1950
326	Organizing a portion of the municipality of Hinunangan, province of Leyte, into an independent municipality under the name of Silago	June 20, 1950
327	Amending Executive Order No. 289, series of 1949, organizing the municipality of Santa Ana, province of Cagayan	June 16, 1950
328	Prescribing rules and regulations to carry out the trade and financial agreements signed between the Philippines and the Supreme Commander for the Allied Powers, designating the agencies therefor, and for other purposes	June 22, 1950
329	Creating a Civilian Emergency Administration, defining its powers and duties and providing for the coordination and control of civilian organizations for the protection of the civil population in extraordinary and emergency conditions	July 1, 1950
330	Creating the National Security Council	July 1, 1950
331	Fixing the ceiling prices of commodities and other purposes	July 7, 1950
332	Fixing the ceiling prices of textbooks and for other purposes	July 13, 1950
333	Authorizing the Price Administration Board to make adjustments in the maximum prices to which an importer or wholesaler is entitled	July 15, 1950
334	Converting the municipal district of Claveria, province of Oriental Misamis, into a regular municipality	July 22, 1950
335	Fixing the date of organization of the government of the city of Butuan	July 21, 1950
336	Transferring to the Philippine Ground Force, Armed Forces of the Philippines, 5,000 officers and enlisted men at present assigned to the Philippine Constabulary	July 25, 1950
337	Fixing the ceiling prices of school supplies and for other purposes	July 27, 1950
338	Waiving the additional progressive taxes to be collected from, and paid by, proprietors and operators of certain sugar mills for the 1949–1950 crop	July 31, 1950
339	Directing the Armed Forces of the Philippines to seize and impound combat military equipment, such as tanks, armored cars and/or their spare parts, half-track scout cars, weasels, duck tanks, all other armored vehicles whether on wheels, tracks, or amphibious, and radar equipment in the possession of private individuals	August 7, 1950
340	Promulgating rules and regulations for the organization and training of Civilian Emergency Administration Guards	August 9, 1950
341	Establishing rules and regulations for the qualification of industries for tax exemption under Republic Act No. 35	August 9, 1950
342	Defining the ceiling prices of commodities for the city of Manila and suburbs, the provinces and for other purposes	August 14, 1950
343	Fixing the ceiling prices of commodities and for other purposes	August 14, 1950
344	Amending Executive Order No. 318, dated May 25, 1950, creating the Integrity Board	September 7, 1950
345	Creating the Peace Fund Campaign Commission	September 19, 1950
346	Abolishing the Shipping Administration and transferring its powers, functions, duties and assets to the Rehabilitation Finance Corporation	September 22, 1950
347	Providing for the organization of barangay associations	September 22, 1950
348	Organizing the Philippine Information Service	September 29, 1950
349	Amending Section One of Executive Order Numbered Three Hundred and Thirty-One and repealing Section Four of Executive Order Numbered Three Hundred and Forty-Three and for other purposes	October 2, 1950
350	Creating the Price Stabilization Corporation and dissolving the Philippine Relief and Trade Rehabilitation Administration and the National Rice and Corn Corporation	October 3, 1950
351	Authorizing the Import Control Board to exercise temporarily the powers, duties and functions of the Import Control Commissioner	October 5, 1950
352	Amending Section 1 of Executive Order No. 331 and Section 1 of Executive Order No. 343 and for other purposes	October 6, 1950
353	Fixing the ceiling prices of commodities and for other purposes	October 6, 1950
354	Authorizing the assignment of any official of the Government or any Government entity, agency or corporation as Import Control Commissioner	October 20, 1950
355	Creating the Land Settlement and Development Corporation and dissolving the National Land Settlement Administration, and the Rice and Corn Production Administration and the Machinery and Equipment Department of the National Development Company	October 23, 1950
356	Creating the National Shipyards and Steel Corporation and dissolving the National Shipyard and Heavy Industries Department, the Engineer Island Shops, the Steel Mill Project and the Reparation Tools Department of the National Development Company	October 23, 1950
357	Adding the increase of two per centum in the sales tax to prices fixed in Executive Orders Numbered Three Hundred Thirty-One, Three Hundred Thirty-Two, Three Hundred Thirty-Seven and Three Hundred Forty-Three	October 27, 1950
358	Further amending Executive Order No. 318, dated May 25, 1950, creating the Integrity Board	November 1, 1950
359	Amending Section One of Executive Order Numbered Three Hundred and Thirty-One	November 3, 1950
360	Fixing the ceiling prices of commodities and for other purposes	November 3, 1950
361	Fixing the ceiling prices of commodities and for other purposes	November 3, 1950
362	Organizing a portion of the municipality of Dimataling, Zamboanga, into a municipality under the name of Dinas, and annexing to the municipality of Dimataling sitios Guilisan, Saloagan and Magahis of the municipality of Margosatubig, same province	November 9, 1950
363	Amending Section One of Executive Order Numbered Three Hundred Thirty-One, as amended by Executive Order Number Three Hundred and Fifty-Nine	November 9, 1950
364	Abolishing the National Cooperatives and Small Business Corporation and transferring its powers, duties, functions, properties, assets and liabilities to the Department of Commerce and Industry, and for other purposes	November 10, 1950
365	Reorganizing the Civil Aeronautics Administration, abolishing the National Airports Corporation created under Republic Act No. 224 and transferring its functions, funds, capital and properties to the Civil Aeronautics Administration, creating a revolving fund for the operation of the Manila International Airport, and for other purposes	November 10, 1950
366	Intensifying the campaign and extending up to June 19, 1951, the period fixed in Executive Order No. 145, dated June 19, 1948, and Executive Order No. 190, dated December 16, 1948, for the collection of funds with which to finance the repair or reconstruction of the house of Dr. Jose Rizal in Calamba, Laguna, and of Dapitan Park in Zamboanga	November 10, 1950
367	Abolishing the National Urban Planning Commission and the Capital City Planning Commission and creating in lieu thereof the National Planning Commission	November 11, 1950
368	Reorganizing the municipalities and municipal districts in the province of Nueva Vizcaya into ten municipalities, defining their boundaries, and abolishing the municipal districts	November 11, 1950
369	Fixing the ceiling prices of commodities and other purposes	November 13, 1950
370	Amending Executive Order Numbered Three Hundred and Thirty-One, Executive Order Numbered Three Hundred and Forty-Three and Executive Order Numbered Three Hundred Fifty-Three and for other purposes	November 13, 1950
371	Amending Executive Order No. 348, dated September 29, 1950, so as to change the name of the Philippine Information Service to Philippine Information Council	November 20, 1950
372	Abolishing and providing for the liquidation of the National Abaca and Other Fibers Corporation, the National Coconut Corporation, the National Tobacco Corporation, the National Food Products Corporation, and the former enemy-owned or controlled corporations or associations transferred to the Republic of the Philippines in accordance with the Philippine Property Act of Nineteen Hundred and Forty-Six (Act of Congress of the United States of July 3, 1946) and Republic Act Numbered Eight, and for other purposes	November 24, 1950
373	Amending Executive Order No. 331, Executive Order No. 343 and Executive Order No. 353, and for other purposes	November 27, 1950
374	Fixing the ceiling prices of pneumatic tires and tubes and for other purposes	November 27, 1950
375	Organizing a portion of the municipality of Baler, province of Quezon, into an independent municipality under the name of Dipaculao	November 27, 1950
376	Abolishing the Rural Progress Administration and transferring its powers, duties, functions, properties, assets and liabilities to the Bureau of Lands, and for other purposes	November 28, 1950
377	Abolishing the Surplus Property Liquidating Committee and transferring its functions, powers and duties to the Board of Liquidators created under Executive Order No. 372, dated November 24, 1950	December 1, 1950
378	Fixing the ceiling price of palay	December 1, 1950
379	Amending Section One of Executive Order Numbered Three Hundred and Thirty-One and for other purposes	December 5, 1950
380	Amending Section Eleven-A of Act Numbered Twenty-Seven Hundred and Six, as amended by Republic Act Numbered Seventy-Four	December 8, 1950
381	Fixing the ceiling prices of commodities and for other purposes	December 8, 1950
382	Amending Executive Order Numbered Three Hundred and Thirty-One, Executive Order Numbered Three Hundred and Forty-Three, and Executive Order Numbered Three Hundred and Fifty-Two, and for other purposes	December 12, 1950
383	Abolishing the Department of the Interior, transferring its powers, duties and functions to the Office of the President, and for other purposes	December 20, 1950
384	Transferring to the Price Stabilization Corporation certain powers and functions of the Import Control Board and the Import Control Administration	December 21, 1950
385	Organizing a portion of the municipality of Dapitan, Zamboanga, into an independent municipality under the name of Rizal	December 21, 1950
386	Creating the Office of Economic Coordination, abolishing the Department of Economic Coordination, and for other purposes	December 22, 1950
387	Amending further the First Paragraph of Executive Order No. 79, dated 17 December 1945, entitled "Creating a Quezon Memorial Committee to take charge of the nation-wide campaign to raise funds for the erection of a national monument in honor of the late President Manuel L. Quezon"	December 22, 1950
388	Declaring certain prime commodities and raw materials in short supply in the Philippines and authorizing the Price Stabilization Corporation to import the same in adequate quantities	December 26, 1950
389	Reorganizing the Armed Forces of the Philippines	December 23, 1950
390	Amending Executive Orders Numbered Three Hundred Fifty-Three, Three Hundred Forty-Two, Three Hundred Fifty-Nine, and Three Hundred Sixty-Three, and for other purposes	December 27, 1950
391	Amending Executive Order No. 346, dated September 22, 1950, and Executive Order No. 372, dated November 24, 1950	December 27, 1950
392	Further reorganizing the different departments, bureaus, offices and agencies of the Government of the Republic of the Philippines, making certain readjustments of personnel and reallotments of funds in connection therewith, and for other purposes	December 31, 1950
393	Converting the present Central Luzon Agricultural School into the Central Luzon Agricultural College, conferring the title of Associate in Agricultural Education and the degrees of Bachelor of Science in Agricultural Education and Master of Science in Agricultural Education, providing for a board of trustees, defining the board's responsibilities and duties, providing professional and technical instruction, and for other purposes	December 31, 1950
394	Creating an Accounting Office and an auditing unit for the Philippine Army	December 31, 1950
395	Organizing certain sitios of the barrio of Santo Niño, municipality of Marabut, province of Samar, into two independent barrios under the names of Ferreras and Lugero	December 31, 1950

== 1951 ==
No.	Title	Date signed
396	Consolidating the Social Welfare Commission and the President's Action Committee on Social Amelioration into the Social Welfare Administration	January 3, 1951
397	Providing for the reorganization and conversion of the Philippine Legations in Rome, Paris, and Madrid into the Philippine Embassy in Madrid, with concurrent jurisdiction over the Philippine Legation in Rome and the concurrent Philippine Legations in Paris, the Vatican, Brussels and the Hague, and for other purposes	January 5, 1951
398	Reorganizing the Deportation Board	January 5, 1951
399	Uniform charter for Government corporations	January 5, 1951
400	Transferring the Office of the Government Corporate Counsel to the Office of the Solicitor General	January 5, 1951
401	Allowing the chairmen and Members of the Integrity Board, the Philippine Information Council, and the Board of Liquidators created under Executive Order No. 318, dated May 25, 1950, Executive Order No. 348, dated September 29, 1950, as amended, and Executive Order No. 372, dated November 24, 1950, respectively, to receive per diem	January 5, 1951
401-A	Creating a Board of Tax Appeals	January 5, 1951
402	Amending Executive Order Numbered Three Hundred and Forty-Three and for other purposes	January 18, 1951
403	Amending Executive Order Numbered Three Hundred and Thirty-One, Executive Order Numbered Three Hundred and Forty-Three, Executive Order Numbered Three Hundred and Fifty-Three, and Executive Order Numbered Three Hundred and Seventy and for other purposes	January 18, 1951
404	Fixing the ceiling prices of commodities and for other purposes	January 18, 1951
405	Implementing Section 3 of Executive Order No. 383, dated December 20, 1950, with respect to the finances of local governments	January 25, 1951
406	Fixing the ceiling prices of commodities and for other purposes	January 31, 1951
407	Fixing the ceiling prices of commodities and for other purposes	February 3, 1951
408	Amending Executive Orders Numbered Three Hundred and Forty-Three, Three Hundred and Fifty-Three, and for other purposes	February 3, 1951
409	Transferring the seat of government of the municipality of Buenavista, province of Iloilo, to the sitio of Calingao in the barrio of Salvacion, same municipality	February 7, 1951
410	Fixing the ceiling prices of commodities and for other purposes	February 10, 1951
411	Amending Executive Order Numbered Three Hundred and Thirty-One, Executive Order Numbered Three Hundred and Forty-Three and for other purposes	February 10, 1951
412	Designating the National Shipyards and Steel Corporation as the agency to accept bids and to enter into contract with successful bidders for the collection of scrap iron, steel, copper, brass, lead and other metal products on land or to collect and dispose of same	February 10, 1951
413	Fixing the ceiling price of red or yellow corn and for other purposes	February 16, 1951
414	Further amending Section 5-a of Chapter III of Executive Order No. 178, dated December 17, 1938, entitled "Prescribing the procedure, including the modes of proof, in cases before courts-martial, courts of inquiry, military commissions and other military tribunals of the Army of the Philippines," as amended by Executive Order No. 47, dated June 6, 1945, and Executive Order No. 264, dated September 8, 1949	February 16, 1951
415	Reorganizing the Government Quarters Committee	February 20, 1951
416	Further amending Executive Order No. 259, dated August 30, 1949, as amended by Executive Order No. 315, dated May 5, 1950 creating a Fire Prevention Board	February 21, 1951
417	Fixing the ceiling price of roasted ground coffee and for other purposes	February 24, 1951
418	Fixing office hours during the hot season	March 5, 1951
419	Fixing the ceiling prices of commodities and for other purposes	March 8, 1951
420	Amending Executive Order Numbered Three Hundred and Thirty-One, Executive Order Numbered Three Hundred and Forty-Three and for other purposes	March 8, 1951
421	Amending Section One of Executive Order Numbered Three Hundred and Thirty-One, Executive Order Numbered Three Hundred and Fifty-Two and for other purposes	March 8, 1951
422	Amending Paragraphs One, Four, Thirteen, Fourteen and Twenty-Seven of Executive Order No. 303, dated September 26, 1940, entitled "Promulgating rules and regulations governing the appointment and supervision of Government pensionados"	March 8, 1951
423	Amending Executive Order Numbered Three Hundred Eighty-Eight, dated December Twenty-Six, Nineteen Hundred and Fifty, entitled "Declaring certain prime commodities and raw materials in short supply in the Philippines and authorizing the Price Stabilization Corporation to import the same in adequate quantities"	March 9, 1951
424	Further amending Executive Order Numbered Twenty-Four, dated November Twelve, Nineteen Hundred and Forty-Six, as amended by Executive Order Numbered Eighty-Six, dated September Three, Nineteen Hundred and Forty-Seven "Creating the National Advisory Health Council"	March 10, 1951
425	Amending Executive Order Numbered Three Hundred Ninety-Eight	March 14, 1951
426	Amending Executive Order Numbered Three Hundred and Thirty-One, Executive Order Numbered Three Hundred and Forty-Three, Executive Order Numbered Three Hundred and Seventy-Four, Executive Order Numbered Three Hundred and Eighty-One, Executive Order Number Three Hundred and Eighty-Two, Executive Order Numbered Four Hundred and Ten, and for other purposes	March 20, 1951
427	Amending Executive Order Numbered Three Hundred and Forty-Three and Executive Order Numbered Three Hundred and Seventy, and for other purposes	April 3, 1951
428	Allowing the addition of one per centum municipal tax to prices fixed in Executive Orders Nos. 331, 332, 337, 343, 352, 353, 360, 361, 369, 370, 373, 374, 379, 381, 382, and 390	April 3, 1951
429	Further amending Executive Order No. 24, dated November 12, 1946, as amended by Executive Order No. 86, dated September 3, 1947, and Executive Order No. 424, dated March 10, 1951, entitled "Creating the National Advisory Health Council"	April 7, 1951
430	Amending Executive Order No. 331, Executive Order No. 343, Executive Order No. 369 and Executive Order No. 404 and for other purposes	April 9, 1951
431	Fixing the ceiling prices of commodities and for other purposes	April 9, 1951
432	Transferring the seat of government of the municipality of Lebak, province of Cotabato, from its present location at Kalamansig to the barrio of Salaman of the same municipality	April 12, 1951
433	Establishment rules and regulations for the qualification of industries for tax exemption under Republic Act No. 35, and revoking Executive Order No. 341, dated August 9, 1950	April 13, 1951
434	Amending Executive Order Numbered Three Hundred and Seventy-Three and for other purposes	April 16, 1951
435	Amending Executive Order No. 361, Executive Order No. 381, Executive Order No. 382, and Executive Order No. 404, and for other purposes	April 24, 1951
436	Abolishing the municipalities of Gamay and Lapinig in the province of Samar and consolidating their respective territories into an independent municipality under the name of Lapinig	April 26, 1951
437	Amending Executive Order No. 330, dated July 1, 1950, creating the National Security Council	April 28, 1951
438	Fixing the date of organization of the government of the city of Roxas	May 3, 1951
439	Further amending Executive Order No. 318, dated May 25, 1950, creating the Integrity Board	May 4, 1951
440	Amending Executive Order Numbered Three Hundred and Forty-Three, Executive Order Numbered Three Hundred and Eighty-Two, Executive Order Numbered Three Hundred Ninety, Executive Order Numbered Four Hundred and Three and Executive Order Numbered Four Hundred and Twenty, and for other purposes	May 8, 1951
441	Further amending Executive Order No. 259, dated August 30, 1949, creating a Fire Prevention Board	September 7, 1950
442	Amending Executive Order Numbered Three Hundred and Forty-Three, Executive Order Numbered Three Hundred and Fifty-Two, Executive Order Numbered Three Hundred and Fifty Three, Executive Order Numbered Four Hundred and Thirty-Five, repealing Executive Order Numbered Three Hundred and Sixty-One, and for other purposes	May 26, 1951
443	Amending Executive Order Numbered Three Hundred and Forty-Three, Executive Order Numbered Three Hundred and Seventy-Three, Executive Order Numbered Four Hundred and Eight, Executive Order Numbered Four Hundred and Twenty-One and Executive Order Numbered Four Hundred and Twenty-Seven, and for other purposes	May 29, 1951
444	Waiving the additional progressive tax payable by the Central Santos-Lopez Co., Inc., for the 1949–1950 crop under Section 2 of Commonwealth Act No. 567	June 5, 1951
445	Organizing certain barrios and sitios of the municipality of Lianga, province of Surigao, into an independent municipality under the name of Oteiza	June 6, 1951
446	Authorizing the Price Stabilization Corporation to import certain essential commodities without quota allocation and in such quantities as may be found necessary	June 9, 1951
447	Fixing the ceiling prices of imported foodstuff, repealing all other Executive Orders fixing ceiling prices of the same and for other purposes	June 9, 1951
448	Amending Executive Order Numbered Three Hundred and Forty-Three, Executive Order Numbered Three Hundred and Eighty-One, Executive Order Numbered Four Hundred and Twenty-Seven and repealing Executive Order Numbered Four Hundred and Thirty-Four, and for other purposes	June 9, 1951
449	Repealing Executive Order Numbered Three Hundred and Thirty-Seven and for other purposes	June 9, 1951
450	Amending Executive Order Numbered Three Hundred and Sixty, and Executive Order Numbered Four Hundred and Three, and for other purposes	June 9, 1951
451	Repealing Executive Order Numbered Three Hundred Seventy-Four and Section Three of Executive Order Numbered Four Hundred Twenty-Six and for other purposes	June 9, 1951
452	Repealing Executive Order Numbered Three Hundred Thirty-Two and for other purposes	June 9, 1951
453	Establishing rules and regulations to control, curtail, regulate and/or prohibit the exportation or re-exportation of certain items from the Philippines, to implement Republic Act No. 613	June 19, 1951
454	Further amending Executive Order No. 24, dated November 12, 1946, as amended, entitled "Creating the National Advisory Health Council"	June 22, 1951
455	Further amending Executive Order No. 398, dated January 5, 1951, entitled "Reorganizing the Deportation Board," as amended by Executive Order No. 425, dated March 14, 1951	June 25, 1951
456	Creating the Import Control Commission to assist the President in the execution of Republic Act Numbered Six Hundred and Fifty, providing for the regulation of imports into the Philippines	July 1, 1951
457	Amending Executive Order No. 38, dated January 7, 1947, entitled "Providing for the Coat of Arms, Seal, and Flag of the President and Vice President of the Philippines"	July 4, 1951
458	Creating an Inter-Departmental Committee on Cottage Industries	July 13, 1951
459	Amending Executive Order Numbered Four Hundred and Forty-Three, Executive Order Numbered Four Hundred and Forty-Seven, fixing the ceiling prices of roasted ground coffee locally prepared and for other purposes	July 20, 1951
460	Amending Executive Order Numbered Three Hundred Forty-Three, Executive Order Numbered Three Hundred and Fifty-Three, Executive Order Numbered Four Hundred and Seven, Executive Order Numbered Four Hundred and Eight and Executive Order Numbered Four Hundred and Forty-Eight, fixing ceiling prices of imported essential commodities and for other purposes	July 27, 1951
461	Amending Executive Orders Numbered Four Hundred Forty-Seven, Four Hundred Forty-Nine, Four Hundred Fifty-One and Four Hundred Fifty-Two	July 27, 1951
462	Creating the municipalities of Tacurong and M'lang in the province of Cotabato	August 3, 1951
463	Amending Section One of Executive Order No. 342, dated August 14, 1950, entitled "Defining the ceiling prices of commodities for the city of Manila and suburbs, the provinces and for other purposes"	August 18, 1951
464	Fixing the ceiling prices of commodities, amending Executive Order Numbered Four Hundred and Forty-Two, Executive Order Numbered Four Hundred and Forty-Seven, Executive Order Numbered Four Hundred and Forty-Nine and Executive Order Numbered Four Hundred and Fifty-Two, and for other purposes	August 21, 1951
465	Reclassifying the provinces of the Philippines	August 22, 1951
466	Reclassifying all municipalities in the Philippines	August 22, 1951
467	Organizing the municipalities of Polanco and New Piñan in the province of Zamboanga	August 22, 1951
468	Organizing certain portion of the municipality of Margosatubig, province of Zamboanga, into an independent municipality under the name of Alicia	August 22, 1951
469	Organizing a certain portion of the municipality of Sindangan, province of Zamboanga, into an independent municipality under the name of Liloy	August 22, 1951
470	Providing instructions to be followed in the conduct of public affairs during the time that the President is outside the Philippines	August 24, 1951
471	Revising Appendix A of Republic Act No. 650, banning the importation of certain commodities and providing the procedure of importing goods under ECA authorizations	August 24, 1951
472	Creating a National Advisory Board on Vocational Education	August 24, 1951
473	Creating the Philippine Committee on Geographical Names	August 25, 1951
474	Amending Executive Order Numbered Four-Hundred and Thirty-Three, dated April Thirteenth, Nineteen Hundred and Fifty-One	August 27, 1951
475	Fixing the ceiling prices of imported and native rice	October 5, 1951
476	Organizing certain barrios of the municipality of San Fernando, province of Pampanga, into an independent municipality under the name of Santo Tomas	October 12, 1951
477	Amending Executive Order No. 345, dated September 19, 1950, by providing additional purposes for which disbursements may be made out of the Peace Fund	October 12, 1951
478	Implementing Republic Act Numbered Six Hundred Thirty-Two, entitled "An Act creating the Philippine Sugar Institute, prescribing its powers, functions and duties, and providing for the raising of the necessary funds for its operation"	October 25, 1951
479	Fixing the ceiling prices of commodities, amending Executive Order Numbered Three Hundred and Thirty-One, Executive Order Numbered Three Hundred and Fifty-Three, and Executive Order Four Hundred and Forty-Seven, repealing Executive Order Numbered Three Hundred and Seventy-Nine and for other purposes	October 25, 1951
480	Terminating the collection of tolls at the Timalan Bridge, Cavite	October 25, 1951
481	Terminating the collection of tolls at the Binakayan (Abubot) Bridge, Cavite	October 25, 1951
482	Amending Executive Order No. 453, dated June 19, 1951, entitled "Establishing rules and regulations to control, curtail, regulate and/or prohibit the exportation or re-exportation of certain items from the Philippines, to implement Republic Act No. 613"	October 31, 1951
483	Establishing the classification of roads	November 6, 1951
484	Prescribing rules and regulations to carry into effect the provisions of Republic Act Numbered Six Hundred and Ten	November 8, 1951
485	Organizing a portion of the municipality of Nabua, province of Camarines Sur, into an independent municipality under the name of Balatan	December 3, 1951
486	Providing for the collection and compilation of historical data regarding barrios, towns, cities, and provinces	December 7, 1951
487	Creating investigating committees on veterans' pension in each municipality and chartered city and enjoining all officers and employees of the Government to render necessary assistance to applicants therefor	December 12, 1951

== 1952 ==
No.	Title	Date signed
488	Creating the Philippine Maritime Committee and defining its powers and functions	January 4, 1952
489	Prohibiting the collection by private individuals or entities or abandoned scrap metals and designating the National Shipyards and Steel Corporation as the sole Governmental agency to collect the same	February 2, 1952
490	Organizing a certain portion of the municipality of Talisayan, province of Misamis Oriental, into an independent municipality under the name of Balingoan	February 2, 1952
491	Further amending Executive Order No. 24, dated November 12, 1946, as amended, entitled "Creating the National Advisory Health Council"	February 6, 1952
492	Directing the importation by the Metropolitan Water District exclusively of aluminum sulphate, chlorine, steel pipes and cast iron fittings without the need of any kind of license which directly or indirectly limits or controls importation and foreign exchange	February 8, 1952
493	Further amending Section 5-a of Chapter III of Executive Order No. 178, dated December 17, 1938, entitled "Prescribing the procedure, including the modes of proof in cases before courts-martial, courts of inquiry, military commissions, and other military tribunals of the Army of the Philippines" as amended by Executive Order No. 47, dated June 6, 1945, Executive Order No. 264, dated September 8, 1949, and Executive Order No. 414, dated February 16, 1951	February 20, 1952
494	Fixing office hours during the hot season	March 11, 1952
495	Terminating the collection of tolls at the Makato Bridge, Capiz	March 20, 1952
496	Fixing the ceiling prices of commodities	March 21, 1952
497	Fixing the ceiling prices of commodities and for other purposes	April 8, 1952
498	Changing the name of the municipality of Lapinig in the province of Samar to Gamay and transferring the seat of government thereof from the barrio of Lapinig to the barrio of Gamay	April 15, 1952
499	Creating a committee to make a final study and advise the President on the proposed revision of the Trade Agreement between the Philippines and the United States	April 24, 1952
500	Directing that all unserviceable property from which scrap metal can be derived and no longer needed by the Government, its branches, agencies and instrumentalities, be transferred, without cost, to the National Shipyards and Steel Corporation	May 2, 1952
501	Further amending Executive Order No. 318, dated May 25, 1950, creating the Integrity Board	May 7, 1952
502	Fixing the ceiling prices of commodities	May 9, 1952
503	Organizing a certain portion of the municipality of Bato, province of Catanduanes, into an independent municipality under the name of San Miguel	May 27, 1952
504	Prohibiting the exportation or re-exportation of war materials, arms, ammunition and other strategic materials and critical items from the Philippines except in certain cases	May 29, 1952
505	Abolishing the municipal district of Sungud in the province of Lanao and annexing the same to the municipal district of Saguiaran, same province	June 2, 1952
506	Organizing a portion of the municipality of Digos, Davao, into an independent municipality under the name of Bansalan	June 6, 1952
507	Opening barrio Sta. Rita, municipality of Batangas, including the adjoining portion of the Municipality of Bauan, as subport of entry	June 6, 1952
508	Authorizing the collection of voluntary contributions for the "Unang Sigaw" Monument in Balintawak and creating a committee for that purpose	June 9, 1952
509	Amending Executive Order No. 499, dated April 24, 1952, entitled "Creating a committee to make a final study and advise the President on the proposed revision of the Trade Agreement between the Philippines and the United States"	June 18, 1952
510	Promulgating rules and regulations implementing Section 13 of Republic Act No. 650, entitled "An Act to regulate imports and for other purposes"	June 30, 1952
511	Prescribing the payment of parachutist pay for officers of the Airborne Battalion of the Armed Forces of the Philippines	July 1, 1952
512	Establishing the Manila Port Area Rat-Proof Building Zone	July 1, 1952
513	Terminating the collection of tolls at the Alacaygan and Magapa Bridges, Iloilo	July 1, 1952
514	Amending Executive Order Numbered Three Hundred and Ninety and for other purposes	July 1, 1952
515	Amending Executive Order Numbered Four Hundred and Forty and Executive Order Numbered Four Hundred and Sixty and for other purposes	July 1, 1952
516	Fixing the ceiling prices of commodities	July 1, 1952
517	Extending the campaign for the collection of funds with which to finance the restoration of the Rizal Home in Calamba, Laguna, and the Rizal Park in Dapitan, Zamboanga, and authorizing the Department of Education to take charge of the administration of said home and park	July 7, 1952
518	Fixing the ceiling prices of commodities and for other purposes	July 11, 1952
519	Providing instructions to be followed in the conduct of public affairs during the time that the President is outside the Philippines	July 12, 1952
520	Amending Paragraph 22 of Executive Order No. 303, dated September 26, 1940	August 4, 1952
521	Banning the importation of certain commodities	August 7, 1952
522	Declaring the Lumban Bridge in the province of Laguna as a national toll bridge and fixing a schedule for the collection of tolls thereon	August 7, 1952
523	Further amending Executive Order No. 318, dated May 25, 1950, creating the Integrity Board	August 8, 1952
524	Requiring all departments, bureaus, offices, agencies, instrumentalities and political subdivision of the Government, including the corporations owned and controlled by the Government, the Armed Forces, Government hospitals, and public educational institutions to buy from the Textile Mills of the National Development Company, whenever available, all their requisitions for clothing matertials	August 12, 1952
525	Terminating the collection of tolls at the Suague Bridge, Iloilo	August 20, 1952
526	Reviving and promulgating anew Executive Order No. 453, dated June 19, 1952 as amended by Executive Order No. 482, dated October 31, 1951	August 20, 1952
527	Terminating the collection of tolls at the Ipil Bridge, Isabela	August 28, 1952
528	Prescribing uniform fees for copies of official records and documents or for certificates furnished private persons and entities	September 1, 1952
529	Establishing and opening the municipalities of Bongao, Sitankai, Balabac, Taganak and Cagayan de Sulu in the Sulu Sea as supports of entry	September 5, 1952
530	Banning the importation of certain commodities	September 12, 1952
531	Fixing the ceiling prices of commodities, amending Executive Order Numbered Three Hundred and Forty-Two, Executive Order Numbered Four Hundred and Forty Seven, Executive Order Numbered Four Hundred and Sixty-Three, Executive Order Numbered Four Hundred and Sixty-Four, and for other purposes	September 12, 1952
532	Terminating the collection of tolls at the Amburayan, Sta. Cruz, Santa Maria-Narvacan, and Banaoang (Quirino) Toll Bridges, province of Ilocos Sur	September 13, 1952
533	Amending Executive Order No. 532 dated September 13, 1952, entitled "Terminating the collection of tolls at the Amburayan, Sta. Cruz; Santa Maria-Narvacan, and Banaoang (Quirino) Toll Bridges, province of Ilocos Sur"	September 23, 1952
534	Fixing new ceiling prices of imported foodstuff, and for other purposes	September 26, 1952
535	Abolishing visa fees in the case of aliens coming to the Philippines as non-immigrants under certain conditions	October 10, 1952
536	Creating the National Traffic Commission as an advisory body in the effective enforcement of all laws, rules and regulations regulating traffic order, safety of traffic and pedestrians; to avoid motor vehicle accidents; and regulate traffic movements to achieve efficiency and economy	October 21, 1952
537	Reducing the 1952 taxes on real properties located on the western side of Lacas Road from the barrio of Lacas to Horasan and from the western side of Cabua-an Road to the seashore, then to Naasag and sitio Volcan within the jurisdiction of Mambajao, province of Misamis Oriental	October 21, 1952
538	Requiring all departments, bureaus, offices, agencies, instrumentalities and political subdivisions of the Government, including the corporations owned and controlled by the Government, the Armed Forces, Government hospitals, and public educational institutions to buy from the National Rice and Corn Corporation, whenever available, all their requirements for rice	October 21, 1952
539	Providing that Executive Order No. 492, dated February 8, 1952, entitled "Directing the importation by the Metropolitan Water District exclusively of aluminum sulphate, chlorine, steel pipes and cast iron fittings without the need of any kind of license which directly or indirectly limits or controls importation and foreign exchange," shall take effect as of July 1, 1951	October 24, 1952
540	Reducing the 1952 taxes on real properties located in the municipalities of Abuyog, Bato, Burauen, Carigara, Capoocan, Dagami, Hinunangan, Jaro, Inopacan, Maripipi, Matalom, Pastrana, Sogod and Tolosa, all in the province of Leyte	October 28, 1952
541	Reducing the 1952 taxes on real properties located in the municipalities of Capul, Giporlos, Llorente, Marabut, San Antonio, San Julian, and Tarangnan, all in the province of Samar	October 28, 1952
542	Reducing the 1952 taxes on all real properties in the province of Romblon	October 28, 1952
543	Creating the municipality of Lambayong in the province of Cotabato	October 29, 1952
544	Terminating the collection of tolls at the Barcelona and Caluscos Toll Bridges, Sorsogon	November 7, 1952
545	Appropriating funds for urgent and essential public works	November 10, 1952
546	Appropriated funds for relief in the provinces and cities visited by typhoons, floods, droughts, earthquakes, volcanic action, and other calamities, and for other purposes	November 10, 1952
547	Fixing the ceiling prices of commodities and for other purposes	November 11, 1952
548	Reducing the 1952 taxes on all real properties located in the province of Albay	December 4, 1952
549	Creating a committee to take charge of carrying out the project contemplated in Proclamation No. 357 dated December 2, 1952, entitled "Reserving for agricultural settlement purposes a certain parcel of the public land domain situated in the municipalities of Tanay and Montalban, province of Rizal, island of Luzon"	December 5, 1952
550	Terminating the collection of tolls at the Paniqui-on and Talave Toll Bridges, province of Occidental Negros	December 9, 1952
551	Reducing the 1952 taxes on all real properties located in the city of Legaspi	December 9, 1952
552	Fixing the ceiling prices of commodities and for other purposes	December 19, 1952
553	Reducing the 1952 taxes on all real properties located in the province of Catanduanes	December 23, 1952
554	Classifying Oriental Mindoro and Occidental Mindoro and continuing the last classifications of La Union	December 23, 1952

== 1953 ==
No.	Title	Date signed
555	Fixing the ceiling price of commodity, and for other purposes	January 6, 1953
556	Fixing the ceiling price of soil pipes and fittings and amending Section One of Executive Order Numbered Four Hundred and Forty-Seven and for other purposes	January 6, 1953
557	Amending Executive Order Numbered Four Hundred and Forty-Two, and for other purposes	January 16, 1953
558	Authorizing entry into the Philippines without import license of embroidery raw materials consigned without requiring foreign exchange, for processing into finished embroidery products and return to the country of origin	January 17, 1953
559	Organizing a certain portion of the municipality of Tago, province of Surigao, into an independent municipality under the name of Cagwait	January 20, 1953
560	Amending Executive Order Numbered Four Hundred and Fifty, and for other purposes	January 23, 1953
561	Organizing a certain portion of the municipality of Cantilan, province of Surigao, into an independent municipality under the name of Madrid	February 2, 1953
562	Fixing the ceiling price of commodity, amending Executive Order Numbered Four Hundred and Forty, and for other purposes	February 3, 1953
563	Classifying the newly created provinces of Zamboanga del Norte and Zamboanga del Sur	February 6, 1953
564	Fixing the ceiling prices of commodities and for other purposes	February 10, 1953
565	Reducing the 1952 taxes on all real properties located in the city of Naga	February 13, 1953
566	Reducing the 1952 taxes on all real properties located in the province of Marinduque	February 17, 1953
567	Reducing the 1952 taxes on all real properties located in the province of Sorsogon	February 17, 1953
568	Terminating the collection of tolls at the Himoga-an Bridge, Negros Occidental	February 17, 1953
569	Amending Executive Order No. 536 dated October 21, 1952, by changing the composition of the National Traffic Commission created therein	February 17, 1953
570	Repealing Executive Order No. 183 dated February 2, 1939, and Executive Order No. 74 dated August 12, 1947	February 24, 1953
571	Creating a decoration to be known as the Order of Sikatuna	February 27, 1953
572	Creating the municipality of Norala in the province of Cotabato	March 10, 1953
573	Terminating the collection of tolls at the Malitbog Toll Bridge, Capiz	March 13, 1953
574	Amending Executive Order No. 542 dated October 28, 1952, reducing the 1952 taxes on all real properties located in the province of Romblon	March 13, 1953
575	Terminating the collection of tolls at the Sulipan Cut-Off-Channel Bridge, Pampanga	March 23, 1953
576	Further amending Executive Order No. 330, dated July 1, 1950, creating the National Security Council	March 23, 1953
577	Fixing office hours during the hot season	March 24, 1953
578	Changing the limitations in the income of admitted patients in Government hospitals and charity clinics in accordance with the present marked fluctuations of the standard of living	March 24, 1953
579	Amending Executive Order Numbered Four Hundred and Forty-Three, fixing ceiling prices of commodities, goods and articles of direct shipments to ports of entry in Luzon other than Manila, and for other purposes	March 24, 1953
580	Fixing ceiling prices of imported foodstuff, and for other purposes	March 24, 1953
581	Revising Annex A of Executive Order No. 471, dated August 24, 1951, by placing tetanus anti-toxin in 10,000 and 20,000-unit vials under the completely decontrolled category	April 4, 1953
582	Amending Executive Order Numbered 449 and for other purposes	April 4, 1953
583	Classifying newly organized municipalities in the Philippines	April 4, 1953
584	Terminating the collection of tolls at the Tumauini Bridge, Isabela	April 15, 1953
585	Designating the Director of Soil Conservation as a member of the Flood Control Commission	April 15, 1953
586	Reducing the 1952 taxes on all real properties located in the province of Mindoro Oriental	April 28, 1953
587	Reducing the 1952 taxes on all real properties located in the province of Batangas	April 28, 1953
588	Creating the municipality of Karomatan in the province of Lanao	April 30, 1953
589	Amending Executive Order No. 548 dated December 4, 1952, reducing the 1952 taxes on all real properties located in the province of Albay	May 5, 1953
590	Reducing the 1952 taxes on all real properties located in the municipalities of La Paz, Dulag, Pintuyan, Naval, Bontoc, Barugo, Calubian and Palo, all in the province of Leyte	May 5, 1953
591	Reducing the 1952 taxes on all real properties located in the municipalities of Hernani, Gandara, Borongan, Allen, Salcedo, Guiuan and Laoang, all in the province of Samar	May 5, 1953
592	Reducing the 1952 taxes on all real properties located in the province of Masbate	May 8, 1953
593	Publishing the initial classifications of chartered cities, except Manila, Baguio and Quezon Cities, as provided in Section One of Republic Act Numbered Eight Hundred Forty	May 8, 1953
594	Amending Executive Order No. 551, dated December 9, 1952, reducing the 1952 taxes on all real properties located in the city of Legaspi	May 21, 1953
595	Terminating the collection of tolls at the Bued and Manat Toll Bridges, province of Pangasinan	May 27, 1953
596	Organizing the municipalities of Hagonoy, Malalag, Doña Alicia and Babak; in the province of Davao	May 28, 1953
597	Transferring the seat of government of Camalaniugan, Cagayan, from the barrios of Dugo and Bulala, to the barrio of Dacallafugu	May 28, 1953
598	Reducing the 1952 taxes on all real properties located in the municipalities of Arteche, Balanguinga, Canavid, Dolores, Gipapad, Maslog, Maydolong, Mercedes, Oras, Quinapondan, San Policarpio, Sulat and Taft, all in the province of Samar	June 15, 1953
599	Returning to the old poblacion (Centro) the seat of government of the municipality of San Pablo, province of Isabela	June 16, 1953
600	Fixing the ceiling prices of Japanese sardines, and for other purposes	June 16, 1953
601	Prescribing rules and regulations for the appointment of reserve officers in the Regular Force, Armed Forces of the Philippines	June 26, 1953
602	Creating certain barrios in the municipality of Gamay, province of Samar	June 26, 1953
603	Designating the Price Stabilization Corporation to distribute and allocate flour to flour consumers	June 26, 1953
604	Fixing the boundary line between the newly created municipality of Doña Alicia and the municipalities of Tagum and Pantukan, all of the province of Davao, and transferring the seat of government of the municipality of Tagum from the barrio of Hijo to the barrio of Magugpo in the same municipality, thereby amending Executive Order Numbered Five Hundred Ninety-Six dated May 28, 1953, organizing the municipalities of Hagonoy, Malalag, Doña Alicia, and Babak	June 26, 1953
605	Providing instructions to be followed in the conduct of public affairs during the time that the President is outside the Philippines	June 26, 1953
606	Fixing the ceiling prices of galvanized iron sheets and aluminum sheets, repealing Section Four of Executive Order Numbered Four Hundred and Forty-Eight, and Section Three of Executive Order Numbered Four Hundred and Forty, and for other purposes	June 26, 1953
607	Creating a commission to ascertain and study the conditions obtaining in the reclaimed areas and foreshore lands in the district of Tondo, Manila	June 27, 1953
608	Fixing the boundary between the municipalities of San Jacinto and Balilihan, both of the province of Bohol	June 27, 1953
609	Reducing the 1952 taxes on all real properties located in the province of Camarines Sur	August 13, 1953
610	Amending Executive Order No. 592, dated May 8, 1953, entitled "Reducing the 1952 taxes on all real properties located in the province of Masbate"	August 22, 1953
611	Organizing the municipal districts of Esperanza, Concordia, Maygatasan, Maasin, Nuevo Trabajo, Remedios, Nuevo Sibagat, Guadalupe, Bakingking, Baylo, Bunaguit, San Luis, Sta. Ines, Verdu and Milagros, all of the province of Agusan, into a municipality to be known as the municipality of Esperanza	September 11, 1953
612	Creating the municipalities of Bañga and Tupi in the province of Cotabato	September 11, 1953
613	Amending Executive Order Numbered Four Hundred and Forty-Eight and for other purposes	September 12, 1953
614	Repealing Section Three of Executive Order Numbered Four Hundred and Forty-Eight, and for other purposes	September 12, 1953
615	Fixing the ceiling prices of commodity and for other crisis	September 12, 1953
616	Fixing the ceiling prices of commodity, and for other crisis	September 14, 1953
617	Further amending Executive Order No. 542 dated October 28, 1952, as amended by Executive Order No. 574 dated March 13, 1953, reducing the 1952 taxes on all real properties located in the province of Romblon	September 14, 1953
618	Authorizing the Secretary of Agriculture and Natural Resources to transfer to the Irrigation Service Unit of the Department of Agriculture and Natural Resources, for rehabilitation and sale, all irrigation pump systems complete with accessories, at present being maintained, administrated and/or held by the Irrigation Pump Administration	September 14, 1953
619	Describing the boundary line between the municipalities of Parang and Nuling, province of Cotabato, and amending accordingly Executive Order Numbered Two Hundred Nineteen, series of 1949	September 15, 1953
620	Organizing a portion of the municipality of Naujan, province of Oriental Mindoro, into an independent municipality under t he name of Victoria	September 18, 1953
621	Creating the municipality of Tabuelan in the province of Cebu	September 23, 1953
622	Creating the municipality of Pigkawayan	September 30, 1953
623	Creating the municipality of Sapao in the province of Surigao	October 1, 1953
624	Creating the municipality of Cortes in the province of Surigao	October 1, 1953
625	Converting the sitio of Tinago in the municipality of Dauis, Bohol, into an independent barrio under the same name	October 8, 1953
626	Fixing the ceiling prices of Japanese sardines, and for other purposes	October 8, 1953
627	Amending further the First Paragraph of Executive Order No. 79, dated 17 December 1945, entitled "Creating a Quezon Memorial Committee to take charge of the nation-wide campaign to raise funds for the erection of a national monument in honor of the late President Manuel L. Quezon"	October 8, 1953
628	Creating the municipality of Victoria in the province of Samar	October 14, 1953
629	Fixing the ceiling prices of commodities, amending Executive Order Numbered Four Hundred and Forty-Two, Executive Order Numbered Three Hundred and Thirty-One, and for other purposes	October 14, 1953
630	Creating the municipality of Culaba in the province of Leyte	October 16, 1953
631	Creating the municipality of Victoria in the province of Leyte	October 17, 1953
632	Creating the municipality of Villanueva in the province of Misamis Oriental	October 26, 1953
633	Organizing certain portions of the municipalities of Initao and Alubijid, Misamis Oriental, into an independent municipality under the name of Libertad	October 26, 1953
634	Creating the municipality of Victoria in the province of Bohol	October 26, 1953
635	Creating the Roxas Memorial Commission to take charge of the nationwide campaign for funds for the construction of the Roxas Memorial of site reserved for the purpose by Proclamation No. 359 dated December 13, 1952	October 27, 1953
636	Terminating the collection of tolls at Lipay Toll Bridge, province of Zambales	October 27, 1953
637	Adjusting the initial classification of the newly created municipality of Magallon in the province of Negros Occidental	October 29, 1953
638	Creating the municipality of Pilar in the province of Surigao	October 31, 1953
639	Organizing certain portion of the municipality of Tanza, province of Cavite, into an independent municipality under the name of Amaya	November 5, 1953
640	Terminating the collection of tolls at the Imus-Abubot Toll Bridge, province of Cavite	November 5, 1953
641	Terminating the collection of tolls at the Sabang (Mauban) Toll Bridge, province of Quezon	November 5, 1953
642	Amending Executive Order No. 607 dated June 27, 1953, entitled "Creating a commission to ascertain and study the conditions obtaining in the reclaimed areas and foreshore lands in the district of Tondo, Manila"	November 14, 1953
643	Creating the Corps of Professors of the Philippine Military Academy and providing rules and regulations for the appointment and promotion of the members thereof	November 21, 1953
644	Amending Section 5-c of Executive Order No. 601 dated June 26, 1953, entitled "Prescribing rules and regulations for the appointment of reserve officers in the Regular Force, Armed Forces of the Philippines"	November 21, 1953
645	Waiving the additional progressive taxes to be collected from, and paid by, proprietors and operators of certain sugar mills for the 1950–1951 crop	December 5, 1953
646	Amending Paragraphs 17 and 18 of Executive Order No. 303 dated September 26, 1940, entitled "Promulgating rules and regulations governing the appointment and supervision of Government pensionados"	December 7, 1953
647	Amending Executive Order No. 590, dated May 5, 1953, entitled "Reducing the 1952 taxes on all real properties located in the municipalities of La Paz, Dulag, Pintuyan, Naval, Bontog, Barugo, Calubian and Palo, all in the province of Leyte"	December 7, 1953
648	Amending Executive Order No. 609, dated August 13, 1953, entitled "Reducing the 1952 taxes on all real properties located in the province of Camarines Sur"	December 7, 1953
649	Abolishing the municipal district of Sibahay in the province of Surigao and organizing the same into a barrio of the municipality of Lanuza, same province	December 7, 1953
650	Revoking Section 6(c) of Executive Order No. 889 dated December 23, 1950, entitled "Reorganizing the Armed Forces of the Philippines"	December 7, 1953
651	Creating the Roxas Memorial Commission to take charge of the nationwide campaign for funds for the construction of the Roxas Memorial on the site reserved for the purpose by Proclamation No. 359 dated December 16, 1952, and for the construction of a low-cost housing project for disabled war veterans on the site reserved therefor by Proclamation No. 422 dated November 12, 1953	December 15, 1953
652	Transferring from the Secretary of Commerce and Industry to the National Shipyards and Steel Corporation the disposition of sunken, beached or damaged vessels and other craft together with their respective cargo as authorized under Executive Order No 175 dated September 16, 1948	December 15, 1953
653	Waiving the additional progressive taxes to be collected from, and paid by, proprietors and operators of certain sugar mills for the 1951–1952 crop	December 18, 1953
654	Waiving the additional progressive taxes to be collected from, and paid by proprietors and operators of certain sugar mills for the 1952–1953 crop	December 18, 1953
655	Abolishing the Peace Fund Campaign Commission and transferring the unexpended balance of the Peace Fund to the Department of National Defense	December 18, 1953
656	Reducing the 1952 taxes on all real properties located in the province of Camarines Norte	December 18, 1953
657	Transferring the seat of government of the municipality of Santo Tomas, province of Pampanga, from the barrio of San Vicente to the barrio of San Matias in the same municipality	December 22, 1953
658	Further amending Paragraph 13 of Executive Order No. 303 dated September 26, 1940, as amended by Executive Order No. 422 dated March 8, 1951, and Executive Order No. 646 dated December 7, 1953, entitled "Promulgating rules and regulations governing the appointment and supervision of the Government pensionados"	December 23, 1953
659	Amending Executive Order Numbered Two Hundred and Seventy-Nine dated October 11, 1949, creating the municipality of Padre Garcia in the province of Batangas	December 23, 1953
660	Prescribing rules and regulations to carry into effect the provisions of Republic Act Numbered Six Hundred and Ten	December 23, 1953
661	Prescribing regulations governing the receipt and acceptance of donations of money for the national defense and the expenditure thereof	December 23, 1953
662	Correcting certain errors in Executive Order No. 244, series of Nineteen Hundred Forty-Nine, creating the municipalities of Mobo, Baleno, Cawayan, Mandaon, Balud and Uson, in the province of Masbate	December 23, 1953
663	Instituting the Rizal Collegiate Palms and the Mabini Teachers Medal	December 29, 1953
664	Defining and fixing the boundary line between the municipal districts of Atok and Kabayan, both of the sub-province of Benguet, Mountain Province	December 29, 1953
